Prague Ice Cup (Prague Riedell Ice Cup in 2017-2018), is an international figure skating competition held yearly since 2017 in the mid-November in Prague. The competition was initially aimed at the junior and younger categories, with seniors being incorporated in 2019 edition.

Senior medalists

Men

Ladies

Junior medalists

Men

Ladies

Pairs

Advanced novice medalists

Boys

Girls

Pairs

Debs medalists

Boys

Girls

References

External links
 Prague Ice Cup 2019 full results
 Prague Riedell Ice Cup 2018 full results
 Prague Riedell Ice Cup 2017 full results

 2019 edition ISU event page
 2018 edition ISU event page

 2019 edition Golden Skate
 2018 edition Golden Skate

Figure skating competitions
International figure skating competitions hosted by the Czech Republic